is a passenger railway station in located in the town of Ōdai, Taki District, Mie Prefecture, Japan, operated by Central Japan Railway Company (JR Tōkai).

Lines

Station layout
The station consists of two opposed side platforms, connected by a footbridge. The station is unattended.

Platforms

History 
Kawazoe Station opened on 25 September 1923 as a station on the Japanese Government Railways (JGR) Kisei-East Line. The line was extended on to Misedani Station on 15 August 1925. The JGR became the Japan National Railways (JNR) after World War II, and the line was renamed the Kisei Main Line on 15 July 1959. The station has been unattended since 21 December 1983. The station was absorbed into the JR Central network upon the privatization of the JNR on 1 April 1987. The station building was reconstructed in February 2002.

Passenger statistics
In fiscal 2019, the station was used by an average of 77 passengers daily (boarding passengers only).

Surrounding area
Japan National Route 42
Kawazoe Elementary School

See also
List of railway stations in Japan

References

External links

 JR Central timetable 

Railway stations in Japan opened in 1923
Railway stations in Mie Prefecture
Ōdai